Wealthy is an unincorporated community in Leon County, Texas, in the United States.

History
A post office was established in Wealthy in 1894, and remained in operation until it was discontinued in 1914. Its original name of Poor was changed due to popular opinion.

References

Unincorporated communities in Leon County, Texas
Unincorporated communities in Texas